The 1970 Northeast Louisiana Indians football team was an American football team that represented Northeast Louisiana University (now known as the University of Louisiana at Monroe) in the Gulf States Conference during the 1970 NCAA College Division football season. In their seventh year under head coach Dixie B. White, the team compiled a 5–4 record. The Indians offense scored 151 points while the defense allowed 146 points.

Running back Joe Profit received first-team honors on the 1970 Little All-America college football team.

Schedule

References

Northeast Louisiana
Louisiana–Monroe Warhawks football seasons
Northeast Louisiana Indians football